Operation Tidal Wave II was a US-led coalition military operation beginning on or about 21 October 2015 against oil transport, refining and distribution facilities and infrastructure under the control of the Islamic State of Iraq and the Levant. Targets include transport trucks, operated by middlemen, which previously were not usually targeted.

Background
Oil was the largest source of funding for ISIL, representing about half of the group's income. Up to September 2016, ISIL controlled six "key oil fields" in Syria, as well as several oil wells in Iraq.

While oil production and refining facilities have been bombed before, ISIL had been able to quickly repair the damage. The U.S. raid in May 2015 that killed Abu Sayyaf, the "emir" of ISIL's oil production, also obtained extensive documents about the workings of ISIL's oil production and operation. This led to efforts focused on inflicting damage that requires hard-to-get parts or is difficult to repair quickly.

History
In November 2015, the Pentagon released a video showing the use of A-10 and AC-130s in one attack against oil trucks.

On 12 November 2015, The New York Times reported that an email from U.S. military spokesperson Colonel Steven H. Warren said, "We intend to shut it all down." A goal is the reduction by 2/3rds of ISIL oil revenue.

On 16 November 2015, a U.S. Operation Tidal Wave II sortie destroyed 116 ISIL fuel tankers clustered near Abu Kamal, a city on the Syrian border with Iraq. Four A-10 Thunderbolt IIs and two AC-130 Spectre gunships participated in the raid. Before attacking the trucks the planes conducted several low-level, 'show of force' passes.

By late December 2015, Col. Steve Warren announced that airstrikes conducted by the US-led Coalition had destroyed 90% of ISIL's oil production, since the beginning of Operation Tidal Wave II. The Pentagon said that Coalition planes had destroyed about 400 tankers.

On 2 April 2016, the Washington Post reported that more than 200 strikes against oil wells, refineries, pipelines and trucks. U.S. officials said that since the start of the campaign, the Islamic State’s oil production has plummeted, and it has lost both refining capacity and easy access to its black-market dealers in Syria and southern Turkey.

On 7 August 2016, "multiple" coalition warplanes destroyed some 83 oil tankers used by the Islamic State near Albu Kamal. It was not immediately clear if the drivers of the oil tankers in Sunday's raids were forewarned.

Avoidance of civilian casualties
Before Operation Tidal Wave II, attacks against oil transport were generally avoided because of the impact on civilian populations and the possibility of killing civilian truck drivers. To avoid killing civilian truck drivers, the US and its allies are doing low passes with aircraft, dropping warning leaflets and firing warning shots. Even with the new rules of engagement, attacks on makeshift refineries, run by civilians, are still off-limits. The U.S. is still attempting to avoid an environmental disaster as well.

References

Military operations of the Syrian civil war involving the Islamic State of Iraq and the Levant
Military operations of the War in Iraq (2013–2017) involving the Islamic State of Iraq and the Levant
Military operations of the War in Iraq (2013–2017) involving the United States
Military operations of the Syrian civil war involving the United States
Military operations of the Iraqi Civil War in 2015
Military operations of the Iraqi Civil War in 2016
Military operations of the Syrian civil war in 2015
Military operations of the Syrian civil war in 2016
Strategic bombing conducted by the United States